The general classification (or the GC) in road bicycle racing is the category that tracks overall times for riders in multi-stage races. Each stage will have a stage winner, but the overall winner in the GC is the rider who has the fastest cumulative time across all stages. Hence, whoever wins the GC is generally regarded as the winner of the race.

Riders who finish in the same group are awarded the same time, with possible subtractions due to time bonuses. Two riders are said to have finished in the same group if the gap between them is less than three seconds. A crash or mechanical incident in the final 3 kilometres of a stage that finishes without a categorised climb usually means that riders thus affected are considered to have finished as part of the group they were with at the 3 km mark, so long as they finish the stage.

It is possible to win the GC without winning a stage. It is also possible to win the GC race without being the GC leader before the last stage.

The most important stages of a bicycle race for GC contenders are mountain stages and individual time trial stages. Both of these offer the best chance for a single racer to outperform other racers.

Jerseys
In many bicycle races, the current leader of the GC gets a special jersey awarded. In the Tour de France, the leader wears a yellow jersey, in the Giro d'Italia a pink jersey, in the Vuelta a España the leader's jersey is red, and in the Tour Down Under the leader's jersey is ochre.

Jerseys of the major stage races

References

See also
Points classification
Mountains classification
Young rider classification

Road bicycle racing terminology
Grand Tour (cycling)
Cycling records and statistics